Joseph Julius Legerski (born July 24, 1957) is the retired former head women's basketball coach at the University of Wyoming.

Coaching career 
Legerski earned a bachelor of science degree in business education from the University of Wyoming in 1979. After graduating from Wyoming, Legerski became a boys' varsity basketball assistant coach at Rock Springs High School, a position he would hold for five seasons. From 1984 to 1986, Legerski was the head women's basketball coach at Rock Springs High School. Following one season as head women's basketball coach at Western Wyoming Community College, Legerski was an assistant with the Wyoming Cowgirls basketball team from 1987 through 1991.

From 1992 to 2003, Legerski was assistant coach at the University of Utah under Elaine Elliott; he was associate head coach from 1998 to 2003. During his time as an assistant, Utah won three conference tournament championships between the Western Athletic Conference (1991 and 1995) and Mountain West Conference (2000).

Named head coach at Wyoming on May 1, 2003, Legerski was the sixth head coach in team history and is the winningest coach in Wyoming history. He led the Cowgirls to ten 20+ winning  seasons, 8 appearances in the WNIT, and 1 appearance in the NCAA tournament. He also led the Cowgirls to the only postseason tournament championship in program history, the 2007 WNIT.

During the 2018–2019 season Legerski won his 300th career game as the head coach of the Cowgirls. He was the first coach in program history to reach 300 career wins. He also took the team to their first ever Mountain West Tournament Championship appearance in the 2018–2019 season. 

He won 3 Mountain West Conference coach of the year awards, in the 2003–04, 2016–17, and 2017–18 seasons.

On April 24, 2019, Legerski announced that he would not be returning for the next season, as he planned to retire from coaching after 16 years.

Personal life 
Legerski is married and has three children, including stepson Zane Beadles, a former NFL offensive guard.

Head coaching record

References 

1957 births
Living people
American women's basketball coaches
Basketball coaches from Wyoming
High school basketball coaches in the United States
Junior college women's basketball coaches in the United States
People from Rock Springs, Wyoming
University of Wyoming alumni
Utah Utes women's basketball coaches
Wyoming Cowgirls basketball coaches